George Henry Thorn (junior) (12 October 1838 –  15 January 1905) was a Member of the Queensland Legislative Assembly and a Premier of Queensland, Australia.

Early life
George Thorn was born in Sydney, New South Wales, a son of George Thorn (senior) and his wife Jane (née Handcock). His father was one of the founders of the city of Ipswich and a founding Member of the Queensland Legislative Assembly representing the seat of West Moreton.

Thorn was schooled at The King's School, Parramatta. He attended the University of Sydney and was awarded a Bachelor of Arts degree in 1858.

His sister Jane Thorn married George Harris, a Member of the Queensland Legislative Council in 1860. The couple lived for 27 years in the now heritage-listed Newstead House in Brisbane, where their parties were the highlight of Brisbane society.

Political life
At the 1867 colonial election, Thorn followed in his father's footsteps by being elected a Member of the Queensland Legislative Assembly in the seat of West Moreton, which he held until the 1873 election.

Following that, he represented the seat of Fassifern from 25 November 1873 (the 1873 Queensland state election) until he resigned on 9 January 1874 in order to be appointed to the Queensland Legislative Council on 9 January 1874. His brother John Thorn won the resulting by-election in Fassifern on 24 January 1874.

During Thorn's time on the Legislative Council, he was the Government's representative in the Council. He also held the role of Queensland Postmaster-General (9 January 1874 to 8 July 1876).

On 14 June 1876, Arthur Macalister, member for Ipswich, resigned. Although the Legislative Council was a lifetime appointment, Thorn resigned on 16 June 1876 to successfully contest the seat of Ipswich at a by-election on 20 June 1876.

Thorn became Premier of Queensland and Secretary for Public Works and Mines on 5 June 1876. However, he resigned from these roles on 8 March 1877, but remained in the ministry of his successor, John Douglas as Secretary for Public Works from 8 March 1877 to 7 November 1877 and then as Secretary for Public Lands and Mines from 7 November 1877 to 6 February 1878.

On 14 February 1878, Thorn married Celia Constance Maude Uniacke, daughter of Richard Uniacke of Melbourne, at "Ellengowan" on the Darling Downs.

Thorn resigned from the seat of Ipswich on 18 February 1878. John MacFarlane won the resulting by-election on 7 March 1878.

Thorn became Queensland commissioner to the 1878 Paris Exposition. On his return from Europe, on 17 April 1879 by another by-election, he successfully contested the seat of Northern Downs and held it until the 1883 election in September.

On 19 July 1887, Alfred Midgley, the member for Fassifern, resigned. Thorn won the resulting by-election on 4 August 1887. He held the seat until the 1888 election.

On 6 May 1893 (the 1893 Queensland state election), Thorn was elected again in Fassifern. He held the seat until 11 March 1902 when he was defeated in the 1902 election by Thomas de Montmorency Murray-Prior. He had no further involvement in politics after that.

Later life
On 15 January 1905, George Thorn died from heart failure at his home at Booval, Queensland. He was buried in the Anglican section of Ipswich General Cemetery.

Legacy
The gold mining town Thornborough was named after him.

See also
 Members of the Queensland Legislative Assembly, 1863–1867; 1867–1868; 1868–1870; 1870–1871; 1871–1873; 1873–1878; 1878–1883; 1883–1888; 1893–1896; 1896–1899; 1899–1902
 Members of the Queensland Legislative Council, 1870–1879

References 

1838 births
1905 deaths
Premiers of Queensland
University of Sydney alumni
People from Ipswich, Queensland
Members of the Queensland Legislative Assembly
Members of the Queensland Legislative Council
Burials at Ipswich General Cemetery
19th-century Australian politicians
Pre-Separation Queensland